Robert Dickey "Jack" Sisco (November 2, 1904 – December 18, 1983) was an American football player, coach, and official. He served as head football coach at the University of North Texas from 1929 to 1941.  With a record of 74–37–10, Sisco is the second winningest coach in school history, behind Odus Mitchell. His teams won seven conference championships and tied for three others.

A native of Waco, Texas, Sisco prepped at Waco High School playing under coach Paul Tyson. He went on to attend Baylor University, where he was a lineman on the 1924 Baylor Bears football team that won the Southwest Conference title.

After his coaching career, he became a college football referee best remembered for a controversial call in the 1947 Red River Shootout between the Texas Longhorns and Oklahoma Sooners. To this day, some Sooner fans refer to this as the "Sisco Game".

His great-granddaughter, Emilee Sisco, played volleyball at the University of Colorado.

Head coaching record

Football

References

External links
 

1904 births
1983 deaths
American football offensive linemen
College football officials
Baylor Bears football players
North Texas Mean Green football coaches
North Texas Mean Green men's basketball coaches
Sportspeople from Waco, Texas
Coaches of American football from Texas
Players of American football from Texas
Basketball coaches from Texas